Cathrinus Dorotheus Olivius Bang (10 June 1822 – 4 June 1898) was a Norwegian literary historian and professor of Scandinavian literature at the University of Christiania (now the University of Oslo).

He was born at Drammen in Buskerud, Norway.  He was the son of Andreas Bang (1788-1829) and Cathrine Dorothea Schouboe (1795-1822). He attended school at Skien  in  Telemark  and  graduated Cand.theol. with honors in 1852 from the Royal Frederick University. From 1857 to 1862 he was a teacher at the Nissen Latin and Secondary School  (Nissens Latin- og Realskole) in Kristiania (now Oslo).

He was appointed professor of Scandinavian literature at the University of Christiania from 1869. Bang was the first holder of this chair which he continued to hold until just before his death in 1898. He  was succeeded by the biographer and literary historian, Gerhard Gran, who had been his former student.
He remained unmarried but was the adoptive father of Dagny Bang who was among the first female physicians in Norway.

References

1822 births
1898 deaths
People from Drammen
Norwegian literary historians
Academic staff of the University of Oslo
19th-century Norwegian writers
19th-century scholars